Jim Powers (born 1958) is an American professional wrestler.

Jim Powers may also refer to:

 Jim Powers (American football) (1928–2013), American football quarterback, defensive back and linebacker who played for the San Francisco 49ers
 Jim Powers (baseball) (1868–?), Major League Baseball player who pitched for the 1890 Brooklyn Gladiators
 Jim Powers (ice hockey) (born 1936), Canadian ice hockey player

See also
 James Powers (disambiguation)
 James Power (disambiguation)